Highway 734 is a highway in the Canadian province of Saskatchewan. It runs from Highway 11 near Lumsden to Highway 364.

Highway 734 passes near the communities of Brora and Zehner.

See also 
Roads in Saskatchewan
Transportation in Saskatchewan

References 

734